Psychedelic Sexualis, also known as On Her Bed of Roses, is a 1966 film from Albert Zugsmith.

References

External links

1965 films
American drama films
American black-and-white films
1965 drama films
1960s English-language films
1960s American films